Stenophylla cornigera is a species of praying mantis native to Brazil.

References

Mantidae
Mantodea of South America
Insects described in 1843